Friends of God: A Road Trip With Alexandra Pelosi is an HBO television documentary about evangelicals in the United States that is written, directed, produced, and narrated by Alexandra Pelosi. The documentary first aired on January 25, 2007 on HBO. Lisa Heller was supervising producer and Sheila Nevins was executive producer.

In this documentary, Alexandra Pelosi visits several of the largest evangelical Christian church congregations ("megachurches") in the country, such as Lakewood Church and New Life Church (Colorado Springs, Colorado), and interviews their leaders and members. Pelosi also visits other Christian organizations like the Christian Wrestling Federation, and a Christian-themed car club, and a Christian-themed miniature golf course. The documentary also examines the relationship between Christian evangelical churches and political activism.  It covers these organizations' role in modern politics related to issues that include gay rights, abortion, and the creation–evolution controversy.

References

External links
 Alexandra Pelosi official site

Friends of God: A Road Trip With Alexandra Pelosi at HBO.com

American documentary films
2007 television films
2007 films
Documentary films about Christianity in the United States
HBO documentary films
Documentary films about American politics
American evangelicals
Films directed by Alexandra Pelosi
2000s American films